Mount Mitchell is a mountain,  high, standing  southwest of Cape Goldie in the northern part of the Holland Range,  Antarctica. It was mapped by the United States Geological Survey from tellurometer surveys (1961–62) and Navy air photos (1960), and was named by the Advisory Committee on Antarctic Names for Commander G.W. Mitchell, Commanding Officer of the  during U.S. Navy Operation Deep Freeze in 1964.

References

Mountains of the Ross Dependency
Shackleton Coast